Rock Run may refer to:

Rock Run, Alabama, an unincorporated community
Rock Run (Martins Creek tributary), a stream in Pennsylvania
Rock Run (Potomac River tributary), a stream in Maryland
Rock Run School, a historic building near Fieldale, Virginia
Rock Run Township, Stephenson County, Illinois
Rock Run United Methodist Church, Harford County, Maryland